Antonio de Zuloaga or Antonio de Soloaga (Latin: Antonius Zuloaga) (died 21 Jan 1722) was a Roman Catholic prelate who served as Archbishop of Lima (1713–1722).

Biography

On 11 Dec 1713, Antonio de Zuloaga was appointed during the papacy of Pope Clement XI as Archbishop of Lima.
On 14 Apr 1715, he was consecrated bishop by Francisco Cisneros y Mendoza, Titular Bishop of Mactaris.
He served as Archbishop of Lima until his death on 21 Jan 1722.

While bishop, he was the principal consecrator of Alejo Fernando de Rojas y Acevedo, Bishop of Santiago de Chile (1718).

References

External links and additional sources
 (for Chronology of Bishops) 
 (for Chronology of Bishops) 

Bishops appointed by Pope Clement XI
1622 deaths
Roman Catholic archbishops of Lima